Jacopo D'Amico, (born November 29, 1980), known professionally by his stage name Dargen D'Amico, is an Italian singer, rapper, songwriter, record producer and disc jockey.

He started his career in 1997, as member of the rap group "Sacre Scuole", with Gué Pequeno and Jake La Furia. In 2001, after releasing their first album (3 MC's al Cubo), the group disbanded due to quarrels between him and Jake La Furia.

After the experience with "Sacre Scuole", Dargen D'Amico went on a solo career by releasing in 2006 the debut album "Musica senza musicisti", published by Giada Mesi, an independent record label he founded.

In more than 15 years of career he produced a total of 10 albums, covering various themes and genres, and he collaborated with many Italian musicians, singers and rappers of various genre. He mentions Franco Battiato, Enzo Jannacci and Lucio Dalla as his biggest influences.

On 4 December 2021, his participation at the Sanremo Music Festival 2022 was revealed. "Dove si balla" was later announced as his entry for the Festival.

Discography

Studio albums

With Sacre Scuole
2000 – 3 Mc's al cubo (Funk-U-Low)

Solo career
2006 – Musica senza musicisti (Giada Mesi)
2008 – Di vizi di forma virtù (Talking Cat / Universal)
2010 – D' parte prima
2010 – D' parte seconda
2011 – CD'
2012 – Nostalgia istantanea
2013 – Vivere aiuta a non-morire
2014 – D'Io

With Macrobiotics
2011 – Balerasteppin

Singles
2008 – Dargen D'Amico – Sms Alla Madonna
2008 – Dargen D'Amico feat. Two Fingerz – Ex Contadino
2010 – Dargen D'Amico – 40 Anni
2010 – Dargen D'Amico – Ma Dove Vai (Veronica)
2010 – Dargen D'Amico feat. Two Fingerz – In Loop (La Forma Di Un Cuore)
2011 – Dargen D'Amico feat. Daniele Vit – Odio Volare
2011 – Dargen D'Amico – Van Damme (Saddam)

Collaborations
1997 – Chief & Corvo D'Argento & Guè Pequeno
1998 – Chief & Zippo & Sacre Scuole
1997 – Il Circolo – Fuori Dalla Mischia
1997 – Cani da Sfida – Cani Da Sfida
1998 – Chief ft Dargen D'Amico – Nient'altro che ...
1999 – Dr. Macallicious (Chief) ft. Sacre Scuole – "Stato Alterato Di Coscienza"
1999 – Prodigio ft. Dargen D'Amico – Mi Hanno Raccontato
1999 – Prodigio ft. Dargen D'Amico – Buona La Prima
2001 – Sacre Scuole – Comodi Comodi
2001 – Dargen D'Amico ft Don Joe – Bug a Boo Parody
2004 – Club Dogo ft. Dargen D'Amico – Tana 2000
2005 – Chief ft. Dargen D'Amico – Uno, nessuno, centomila
2007 – Crookers ft. Dargen D'Amico – Nchlinez
2008 – Fabri Fibra ft. Dargen D'Amico e Alborosie – Un'altra chance
2008 – TwoFingerz ft. Dargen D'Amico e Joe Fallisi – Oltre Il Mare
2009 – Crookers ft. Dargen D'Amico e Danti – Giorno'n'nite
2009 – Bugo ft. Dargen D'Amico – Buone maniere (The big salt water clock REMIX)
2009 – Fabri Fibra ft. Dargen D'Amico – Via vai
2009 – Two Fingerz + Vacca ft. Dargen D'Amico – Sassi dal cavalcavia
2009 – Two Fingerz ft. Dargen D'Amico – Fiori nei cannoni
2009 – Amari ft. Dargen D'Amico – Dovresti dormire
2009 – Radio Rade ft. Dargen D'Amico – Regina Del Quartiere
2009 – Jody Bipolare ft. Dargen D'Amico – Musica
2009 – Diplo ft. Dargen D'Amico & Phra – Natale Exclusive
2010 – Crookers ft. Dargen D'Amico & Fabri Fibra – Festa Festa
2010 – Crookers ft. Dargen D'Amico, The Very Best &  Marina – Birthday Bash
2010 – Rischio ft. Dargen D'Amico, Lugi & Danti – Dose di pace
2010 – Fabri Fibra ft Dargen D'Amico – Nel mio disco
2010 – Fabri Fibra ft Dargen D'Amico – Insensibile
2010 – Two Fingerz ft. Dargen D'Amico – Blu
2010 – Two Fingerz ft. Dargen D'Amico – Nessuno Ascolta (Na nana nana)
2010 – Two Fingerz ft. Dargen D'Amico & Sewit Villa – Buffo
2010 – Two Fingerz ft. Dargen D'Amico – Puttana
2010 – Two Fingerz ft. Dargen D'Amico – Credi Che T'Amo
2010 – Two Fingerz ft. Dargen D'Amico – Automatico
2010 – Two Fingerz ft. Dargen D'Amico – Erba
2010 – Two Fingerz ft. Dargen D'Amico – Reverse
2010 – Zoy ft. Dargen D'Amico – Colori
2010 – Emiliano Pepe ft 'Dargen D'Amico – Giurami che ci sei
2011 – Fog Prison (Braka, Pablo, Ide) album: Fiero Prigioniero ft. Dargen D'Amico – La trappola più antica
2011 – LuckyBeard (Phra) ft. Dargen D'Amico & Dumbblonde – La cassa spinge
2011 – Don Joe & Shablo ft. Reverendo + Chief + Mixup + Dargen D'Amico – Guarda Bene
2011 – Marracash feat Dargen D'Amico and Rancore – L'albatro
2011 – Fratelli Calafuria feat Dargen D'Amico – Disco Tropical
2011 – Fabri Fibra feat Dargen D'Amico e Marracash – Tranne Te (ExtraRemix)
2011 – Useless Wooden Toys feat Dargen D'Amico – Pioverà Benza
2011 – 3 is a Crowd feat Dargen D'Amico and Tommaso Cerasuolo – Chiusi a Chiave
2012 – Max Brigante feat Dargen D'Amico, Danti and Ensi – Allenatichefabene Remix
2012 – Dargen D'Amico ft Two Fingerz – Hit Da 5 Minuti
2012 – Andra Mirò ft Dargen D'amico – Senza che nulla cambi
2022 - Rkomi ft Dargen D’amico - MALEDUCATA

References

Living people
Italian rappers
1980 births
People of Sicilian descent